Darmsden is a hamlet and civil parish in the Mid Suffolk district of Suffolk, England.

The hamlet is on a private estate and has no public roads, although the main estate road linked to the B1113 is open to all.

References

External links

Hamlets in Suffolk
Civil parishes in Suffolk
Mid Suffolk District